The Stickup is a 2002 American crime thriller film written and directed by Rowdy Herrington and starring James Spader. It was rated R for prostitution, crack smoking and violence. A former cop steals a half million dollars from a small-town bank. Police detective John Parker (Spader) launches a daring high-speed chase through narrow mountain passes to catch him.

Cast and characters
James Spader as John Parker
Leslie Stefanson as Natalie Wright
David Keith as Ray DeCarlo
John Livingston as FBI Agent Rick Kendall
Robert Miano as Lt. Vincent Marino
Alf Humphreys as Mike O'Grady
Tim Henry as Arlen Morris
Mark Holden as Roy Freeman
Scott Heindl as Steve Spizak
Alex Zahara as Tommy Meeker
Alvin Sanders as Harris
Cindy Maines as Female Teller
Karin Konoval as Dr. Alvarez
Christina Jastrzembska as Farm Woman
Chief Leonard George as Chief Samson Redcloud

References

External links
 

2002 films
2002 action thriller films
2002 crime thriller films
American action thriller films
American crime thriller films
Films directed by Rowdy Herrington
Films scored by David Kitay
2000s English-language films
2000s American films